Gloria Estefani Aguilar de Mata (born 12 March 1990) is a Guatemalan footballer who plays as a defender and the Guatemala women's national team.

See also
List of Guatemala women's international footballers

References

1990 births
Living people
Women's association football defenders
Guatemalan women's footballers
Guatemala women's international footballers
Guatemalan expatriate footballers
Guatemalan expatriate sportspeople in Colombia
Expatriate women's footballers in Colombia